Me and You is a 2012 Italian drama film directed by Bernardo Bertolucci, based on the novel with the same name by Niccolò Ammaniti. The film was screened out of competition at the 2012 Cannes Film Festival. It was Bertolucci's final feature film before his death on 26 November 2018.

Plot
Lorenzo has difficulties in communicating with other people and pays more attention to his inner world. When his class goes to the mountains for a week to ski, Lorenzo secretly settles in the basement of his apartment building. However, his loneliness is interrupted with an unexpected appearance of an unfamiliar girl, whose story is closely interwoven with that of Lorenzo and his family.

Cast
 Jacopo Olmo Antinori as Lorenzo
 Tea Falco as Olivia
 Sonia Bergamasco as Lorenzo's mother
 Pippo Delbono as Psychologist
 Veronica Lazar as Lorenzo's grandmother

Reception

On Metacritic the film has a score of 57% based on reviews from 17 critics. Philip French of The Observer called it "a lightweight disappointing affair".

References

External links
 

2012 films
2012 drama films
Italian drama films
2010s Italian-language films
Films directed by Bernardo Bertolucci
Films about siblings
2010s Italian films